Ceylonese Rugby & Football Club Grounds (also known as Longdon Place) commonly known as CR & FC is a multi-purpose stadium complex located in Colombo, Sri Lanka.

It is the home ground of Division 'A' rugby union team, Ceylonese Rugby & Football Club, and on occasion hosts concerts and musical performances.

Concerts
 Spanish singer Enrique Iglesias performed at CR & FC on 20 December 2015 as part of his Sex and Love Tour in Asia
 Irish boy band, Boyzone,  performed at CR & FC Grounds on 16 August 2018 as a part of their Farewell Tour.

References

Sports venues in Colombo
Football venues in Sri Lanka
Multi-purpose stadiums in Sri Lanka